Valmir is a male given name. Notable people with this name include:

 Valmir (footballer, born 1979), Brazilian footballer
 Valmir Aparecido Franci (born 1990), Brazilian footballer
 Valmir Assunção, Brazilian politician and farmer
 Valmir Berisha (born 1996), Swedish footballer
 Valmir Furlani (born 1969), Brazilian footballer
 Valmir Louruz (1944–2015), Brazilian football manager
 Valmir Lucas, Brazilian footballer
 Valmir Nafiu (born 1994), Macedonian footballer
 Valmir Nunes (born 1964), Brazilian runner
 Valmir Pontes Arantes (born 1981), Brazilian footballer
 Valmir Prascidelli (born 1964), Brazilian politician
 Valmir Ribeiro Siqueira (born 1986), Brazilian footballer
 Valmir Seferi (born 1993), Finnish footballer
 Valmir Sulejmani (born 1996), Kosovar footballer

Albanian masculine given names
Brazilian given names